Peter Toshio Jinushi (20 September 1930 – 4 May 2021) was a Japanese Roman Catholic bishop. He was ordained to the priesthood in 1960 and served as bishop of the Roman Catholic Diocese of Sapporo from 1987 to 2009.

References

1930 births
2021 deaths
20th-century Roman Catholic bishops in Japan
21st-century Roman Catholic bishops in Japan
People from Sapporo
Japanese Roman Catholic bishops